The 2021–22 Northeastern Huskies men's basketball team represented Northeastern University during the 2021–22 NCAA Division I men's basketball season. The Huskies, led by 16th-year head coach Bill Coen, play their home games at Matthews Arena in Boston, Massachusetts as members of the Colonial Athletic Association.

Previous season
In a season limited due to the ongoing COVID-19 pandemic, the Huskies finished the 2020–21 season 10–9, 8–2 in CAA to finish as conference co-champions with James Madison. They lost in the semifinals of the CAA tournament to Drexel.

Roster

Schedule and results

|-
!colspan=9 style=| Non-Conference Regular Season

|-
!colspan=9 style=| CAA Regular Season

|-
!colspan=9 style=| CAA tournament

Source

References

Northeastern Huskies men's basketball seasons
Northeastern
Northeastern Huskies men's basketball
Northeastern Huskies men's basketball